John Amboko (born 6 April 1985) is a former Kenyan footballer defender who is currently an assistant coach at Kenyan Premier League side Nairobi City Stars.

Career

Player 
Amboko was a long-serving captain who spent his entire playing career at Nairobi City Stars from 2003 until his full retirement in 2017, save for the 2011 season when he turned out for A.F.C. Leopards.

He announced his retirement as a player following Nairobi City Stars relegation at the end of the 2016 season but later rescinded the decision to feature in the 2017 season.

Coaching 
Alongside his playing career, Amboko coached lower-tier side Vapor Sports that was financed by his workplace Vapor Ministries up until the 2017 season. At some point in the 2017 season, he became Nairobi City Stars interim coach, then assistant coach, while the team featured in second-tier National Super League.

He was the head coach for the rest of the 2018 season and parts of the 2018–19 season. Towards the end of the 2020–21 season, he was named coach towards the close of the season, following the departure of Sanjin Alagic due to the end of his contract.

At the start of the 2021–22 season, Amboko upgraded his coaching badge to CAF B,  as he became an assistant coach following the arrival of Nicholas Muyoti as head coach.

Honours

Club
World Hope
Kenyan Nationwide League
 Champions (1): 2003-4, 
FKF President's Cup
 Champions (1): 2005
Nairobi City Stars
Kenyan National Super League
 Champions (1): 2019-20

References

External links
 

Living people
1985 births
Kenyan footballers
Association football defenders
Nairobi City Stars players
A.F.C. Leopards players
Kenyan Premier League players
Kenyan football managers